Niida Station is the name of two train stations in Japan:

 Niida Station (Fukushima) (二井田駅)
 Niida Station (Kochi) (仁井田駅)